Tapogliano, is a locality and former comune (municipality) in the Province of Udine in the Italian region Friuli-Venezia Giulia, located about 40 km northwest of Trieste and about 25 km southeast of Udine. As of 31 December 2004, it had a population of 452 and an area of 5.0 km².

Tapogliano bordered the following municipalities: Campolongo al Torre, Romans d'Isonzo, San Vito al Torre, Villesse.

In 2009 it became part of the newly created comune of Campolongo Tapogliano.

Demographic evolution

References

Frazioni of the Province of Udine
Former municipalities of Friuli-Venezia Giulia